Liberty Silver (born 1961/1962) is a Canadian singer, based in Toronto, Ontario. Her music draws inspiration from diverse genres, ranging from R&B, Jazz, Pop, Gospel, Reggae to Rock.

Early life 
Liberty Silver was born to a Jamaican-Irish mother and a Hawaiian father, who first met while competing at the Commonwealth Games. Not long after her birth, Silver was placed for adoption by her birth parents and was adopted into a household in Ontario, Canada. Silver grew up in various cities in Ontario, including Kingston and Peterborough. In her later years, she discovered through the Ontario adoption records that she has a biological brother who plays for an Ottawa-based band.

At 12 years old, Silver performed with a Toronto reggae band, The Wild Bunch, as an opening act for Bob Marley’s show at the Madison Square Garden in New York.

Career 
As the first Black woman to receive a Juno Award, Liberty Silver is widely known for paving the way for future generations of Black female artists in the Canadian music industry. She won two 1985 Juno Awards, one for Best R&B/Soul Recording of the Year ("Lost Somewhere Inside Your Love") and the other for Best Reggae/Calypso Recording ("Heaven Must Have Sent You" with Otis Gayle). She has been nominated for a Juno Award a total of five times, from 1985 to 1989. She was also on the Super Dave Osborne show.

As merely 12 years old, she performed in a reggae band as an opening act in New York City for Bob Marley at Madison Square Garden. In 2000, Silver also hosted a TV series known as Centre Stage Chronicles, directed by Sylvia Sweeney and Aeyliya Husain. Season 1 aired a total of 13 episodes, with guests ranging from Martha Chaves to Carol Welsman.

As a member of a supergroup called Northern Lights, she appeared on the platinum-selling 1985 African charity ensemble single "Tears Are Not Enough", singing a duet with Mike Reno of Loverboy. Other artists on the track include Bryan Adams, Anne Murray and Joni Mitchell.

Silver competed as a vocalist on Star Search, winning the competition several weeks in a row. In 2016, she sang Amazing Grace at the funeral of a former Toronto mayor Rob Ford. Other prominent figures Silver performed for include: Former U.S. President Barack Obama, Celine Dion, Desmond Tutu, former President of the Soviet Union Mikhail Gorbachev, among many others.

Silver has appeared in a wide range of distinguished music festivals throughout her career, from Niagara Jazz Festival, The Beaches International Jazz Festival, Antigua Jazz Festival, Ottawa Jazz Festival, Jamaican Air Canada Jazz Festival, Barbados Jazz Festival, Toronto Funk + Soul Festival to TRIUS Jazz Festival, to name a few.

Discography

Albums
 Live! In Session - Liberty Silver With The Bill King Quartet (1994)
At Last (2005)
A Timeless Christmas (2010)
Groove Symphony (2010)
Private Property (2012)

Singles & EPs 

 Rapture Rapp (1980)
 I Need Lovin (1980)
 Tide is High (1980)
 Magic (1981)
 The Sweetest Thing To Me (1983)
 Baby It's You (1988)
 Let It Begin Tonight (1988)
 My Desire (2016) 
 Falling Again (2016)

References

External links
 Liberty Silver on ReverbNation 
 Liberty Silver on YouTube

1960s births
Living people
Canadian contemporary R&B singers
Juno Award for Reggae Recording of the Year winners
Musicians from Detroit
Musicians from Toronto
Canadian soul singers
Juno Award for R&B/Soul Recording of the Year winners
20th-century Black Canadian women singers
21st-century Black Canadian women singers